The Pigne de la Lé is a mountain of the Swiss Pennine Alps, located south of Zinal in the canton of Valais. It lies north of the Grand Cornier, on the range between the Moiry Glacier and the valley of Zinal.

Access roads
To get there you will use the same road as in the case of the nearby Garde de Bordon and Sasseneire, from Sierre in the Rhone valley. This is the only access  which will take you to the parking at the end of the road above the Moiry lake and at the altitude of 2350 m.

Climbing Pigne de la Lé
The normal route starts at the mentioned parking. From there you will follow the signs toward the Moiry hut (2825 m). After the hut you can climb the mountain following the rocky ridge or the glacier route. The former is shorter and you will not need any special equipment in the summer time. The latter is a glacier route all the time.

Other peaks to climb around
There are many peaks which you can climb once you are at the Moiry lake area. I would point out these:
 Garde de Bordon.
 Sasseneire.
 Becs de Bosson.

Huts
 Moiry hut.
 Becs de Bosson hut.

References

External links
 Pigne de la Lé on Hikr
 Pigne de la Lé - Routes description on Mountains for Everybody

Mountains of the Alps
Alpine three-thousanders
Mountains of Switzerland
Mountains of Valais